Stirling is a suburb of Canberra, Australian Capital Territory, Australia. It is located in the Weston Creek district.

The suburb is named after Sir James Stirling (1791–1865) who was the first Governor of Western Australia between 1829–1839 and established settlements at Perth and Fremantle in 1829. The suburb was gazetted in 1970. Its streets are named after Western Australian pioneers.

Stirling contains the Weston Campus of the Canberra College, which is located on Fremantle Drive.

Geology

Deakin Volcanics  red-purple and green grey rhyodacite  with spherulitic texture  cover most of Stirling except for Laidlaw Volcanics pale to dark grey tuff on the southernmost quarter.
Quaternary Alluvium covers the south west quarter.

References

Suburbs of Canberra